The Wheaton Bandit is an unidentified bank robber suspected to be responsible for as many as 16 armed robberies around Wheaton, Illinois from 2002 to 2006. He appeared to be 25 to 35 years old at the time of the robberies, always wore a hood or ski mask, and wore different clothing in each robbery. Instead of placing his finger on the gun trigger, he often kept his trigger finger along the side of the gun, a safety position that suggests firearms training.  Outlines of his jackets suggest that he also wore a bulletproof vest.

Reported sightings
There were at least two possible sightings of the Wheaton Bandit without a face covering. In late December 2004, an unidentified man entered the MidAmerica Bank in Glen Ellyn without conducting a transaction, but was recorded by the bank's security cameras. Two weeks later, in January 2005, the Wheaton Bandit robbed the bank, and the December visitor fit the known physical description of the robber. On November 29, 2006, a witness spotted a suspicious man in the parking lot of the Fifth Third Bank one hour before it was robbed. This witness helped the police draw a composite sketch of the suspicious person.

After the sketch of the parking lot man was released to the public on December 11, 2006, the crime spree abruptly ended and there were no further reports of the Wheaton Bandit. Despite a $50,000 reward being offered for information about the robber, the five-year statute of limitations on the bank robbery charges ran out on December 7, 2011.

Robberies

See also
List of fugitives from justice who disappeared

References

External links
 American Greed season 1 episode 4 — information, interviews, and other video
 Wheaton Bandit – 462 North Park, Glen Ellyn, IL on BanditTracker Chicago — camera images and description

Wheat
Wheat
Wheat
Wheat
Wheat
Wheat
21st-century American criminals
American bank robbers
Crime in Illinois
Fugitives
Living people
People from Wheaton, Illinois
Unidentified American criminals
Unsolved crimes in the United States
Year of birth missing (living people)